Videoplasty is the third home video by Primus, following 1993's Cheesy Home Video and the fan club exclusive Horrible Swill. Videoplasty was released at the end of 1998 to complement the band's recent covers EP Rhinoplasty, and is composed mostly of highlights from a live show performed on October 14 that year at The Phoenix Theater in Petaluma, California. This live footage is interspersed with montages of clips filmed during previous tours and at other recent shows, footage shot backstage and in the studio, animations by bassist Les Claypool, and the band's then-current music videos, spanning the previous two years back to the recording of the Brown Album and presented in approximate reverse-chronological order.

Track listing
"To Defy the Laws of Tradition"
"Groundhog's Day"
Rhinoplasty Recording Session
Sno-Core Tour Fall 1998
"Kalamazoo"
"Too Many Puppies" / "Hello Skinny"
In the Studio with the Dust Brothers for [the] Orgazmo Movie
Recording with Rick Rubin for [the] South Park Album
Primus and Spearhead [at the] Benefit for Calder Spanier
"Tommy the Cat" (partial) / Europe Summer 1997 / Australia Spring 1998
DJ Disk and Brain jam / "Tommy the Cat" (reprise)
The Pitfalls of Eating Your Own Genitalia (animation)
"Seas of Cheese" / "Over the Falls" (intro)
"Over the Falls" (music video) - Directed by Les Claypool
The Making of the "Over the Falls" Music Video
Primus Records with Tom Waits in 1997
"Bob's Party Time Lounge"
New Year's Eve Dec. 31, 1997
US Tour Fall 1997
"Those Damned Blue-Collar Tweekers"
The H.O.R.D.E. Tour Summer 1997
The Skeeter Drinks the Taboo Fluid and Enters the World of the Undead (animation)
"Shake Hands with Beef" (music video) - Directed by Les Claypool
The Making of [the] "Shake Hands with Beef" Video
The Making of the Brown Album
"Here Come the Bastards"
Credits
"The Devil Went Down to Georgia" (music video) - Directed by Mike Johnson

Notes
All songs written by Primus, except "Hello Skinny" by The Residents and "The Devil Went Down to Georgia" by the Charlie Daniels Band.
Calder Spanier was the saxophonist for Charlie Hunter's band. He was killed in a road accident in December, 1997.
The song seen being recorded with Tom Waits is a cover of Jack Kerouac's track "On the Road" for the compilation album Jack Kerouac Reads On the Road. It was also later included on Waits' collection Orphans: Brawlers, Bawlers & Bastards.
2003's Animals Should Not Try to Act Like People DVD includes the three music videos from Videoplasty together with the "Making of the Brown Album" segment.
Design by Zoltron

Personnel
Les Claypool - bass, vocals
Larry LaLonde - guitar
Bryan "Brain" Mantia - drums
DJ Disk - turntables on the DJ Disk and Brain jam / "Tommy the Cat" (reprise) and "Here Come the Bastards"
Buckethead - guitar on "Those Damned Blue-Collar Tweekers", stage theatrics during the DJ Disk and Brain jam and "Here Come the Bastards"
"The Devil Went Down to Georgia" performed by Festus Clamrod and The El Sobrante Twangers
Les Claypool - vocals and bass
Larry LaLonde - banjo
Bryan "Brain" Mantia - drums
Mark "Mirv" Haggard - slide guitar and voice of Johnny
Bryan Kehoe - voice of the Devil
Violina Misteriosa - violin

References

Primus (band) video albums
1998 video albums
Interscope Records video albums
Prawn Song Records video albums